Streetsville Secondary School is a high school in the Peel District School Board located in the Streetsville Village community of Mississauga, Ontario, Canada.

Description and history
Streetsville Secondary School was opened in 1957. The school has approximately 900 students, with about half enrolled in the French Immersion program. As of February 2019, forty students are bused in.

The school features a main floor and a second floor on its north side. It has two gymnasiums, one large in size, and the second being half the size of the first. When the school first opened, the smaller gym was originally intended to be a swimming pool. The school also has a library, which was renovated and expanded, a weight room, and a cafeteria.

The school has several unusual classes including Grade 11 and 12 Photographic Arts, the unusual aspect being the darkroom available for student use, one of the last remaining in the Peel school system. Also available to students is Music Production, a course teaching the recording and mastering of music using computers.

In 2005, the French immersion programme for students was introduced at Streetsville Secondary School where students can learn bilingualism in Canada. The courses offered are: French Immersion (Grades 9-12), Science, and Geography of Canada (Grade 9), Contemporary Canadian History, Career Studies, and Civics (Grade 10), World History to the 16th Century (Grade 11), and Canadian and World Issues: A Geographic Analysis (Grade 12).

Up until the summer of 2005, the school had 13 portable buildings. However, in 2005, Mississauga Secondary School opened in the area and about half of the grade 9 and 10 students attending Streetsville had to switch schools due to boundary changes. This dropped the overall attendance by about 500, and all of the portables have been removed. The sole portable remaining was used as an extension of the school's drama room until it was removed in 2006 due to budget cuts. In 2015, the roof of the portapac collapsed due to flooding after a heavy rainstorm. Mold was discovered within the portapac and as such, it was boarded up. 3 portables have been added to the back of the school to replace the portapac, which was removed during the $7 million renovation/expansion that the school underwent during the summer of 2015 and the 2015-16 school year that included the removal of all materials containing asbestos from the building as well as installing new windows throughout the building. The portapac was replaced with a permanent extension to the school.

Notable students and alumni
Ibrahim Aboud - terror-plot convict 
Morag Smith - comedian
Zaib Shaikh City of Toronto Film Commissioner and Director of Entertainment Industries, actor, writer and director.

Sports

Streetsville Secondary School offers many athletic opportunities, including: rugby, basketball, volleyball, track and field, hockey, swimming, badminton, flag football, and rugby sevens. Streetsville has won Senior Boys ROPSSAA (Region of Peel Secondary Schools Athletic Association) Gold Medal in Rugby, as well as an OFSAA Gold Medal, finishing their 2012 season with 32 wins and 0 losses. The school also has an archery team that does exceptionally well each year winning many Olympic class Gold, Silver and Bronze Medals in ROPSSAA and OFSAA. Also, in 2021 the Senior Boys Volleyball team went 0-4 (clapped) in OFSAA located in North Bay.

Streetsville won its only hockey championship in 2005, coming from behind in both the semi-final and final. The win is still one of the most celebrated events at school reunions.

The junior girls rugby team maintained an 8 game winning streak in the 2022 15s season. They finished 1st at ROPSSAA, defeating St. Francis Xavier 31-0 in the final.

See also
List of high schools in Ontario

References

External links
 Streetsville Secondary website

Peel District School Board
High schools in Mississauga
Educational institutions established in 1957
1957 establishments in Ontario